Patricia Bernstein (née Hoffman; born in 1944) is an American writer and public relations expert. She is best known for her books Ten Dollars to Hate: The Texas Man Who Fought the Klan and The First Waco Horror: the Lynching of Jesse Washington and the Rise of the NAACP.

Biography

A native Texan, Patricia Bernstein was born in El Paso and grew up in Dallas.  She graduated from Smith College with a Degree of Distinction in American studies, having studied with such prominent academics as historian Arthur Mann, Cervantes authority Juan Bautista Avalle-Arce, and literary scholar Daniel Aaron.  She was named to Phi Beta Kappa during her junior year at Smith.   Most of her college education was supported by a generous scholarship from Procter & Gamble.  She subsequently audited courses at Rice University in Latin and medieval history.

Bernstein started her own public relations firm in Houston in 1983. The firm has now been in business for over 30 years.

She is also a writer and historian, who has published numerous newspaper and magazine articles in media as diverse as Smithsonian, Texas Monthly and Cosmopolitan. She has published two books. Her first book, Having a Baby: Mothers Tell Their Stories, a collection of first-person childbirth experiences from the 1890s to the 1990s, was published by Pocket Books, a division of Simon & Schuster.

In 2005, Bernstein's second book, The First Waco Horror: the Lynching of Jesse Washington and the Rise of the NAACP, was published by Texas A&M University Press. The book tells the story of the lynching of Jesse Washington in Waco in 1916, how the lynching affected the growth of the fledgling National Association for the Advancement of Colored People (NAACP), and how a young women's suffrage activist was drafted by the NAACP to go to Waco and investigate the lynching.

Bernstein handled all the publicity for this book herself, generating dozens of interviews, news stories and book reviews in national and local media including The New York Times, The Washington Post, The Dallas Morning News, National Public Radio and the Canadian Broadcasting Corporation. She is still being invited to give lectures about this book.  In 2012, she was asked to shoot an interview about the lynching of Jesse Washington and the early years of the NAACP for the NAACP Archives.

Bernstein's third book, Ten Dollars to Hate: The Texas Man Who Fought the Klan, was published in spring 2017 by Texas A&M University Press. Ten Dollars to Hate was a finalist for a 2017 award from the Texas Institute of Letters and was named twice by the Austin American-Statesman of the 50 best books ever written about Texas.

The book tells the story about the only mass-movement version of the Ku Klux Klan (KKK), the 1920s Klan, which had between one and three million members across the entire U.S., not just in the Deep South.  Revived in 1915 by a failed preacher and vigorously promoted by two Atlanta publicists, the 1920s KKK seized municipal government and law enforcement in many communities, indulged in extravagant violence against whites and blacks alike, and actually elected Klan governors and sent Klan senators to Washington.

The book's hero is a 29-year-old Texas district attorney Dan Moody who, in a series of dramatic trials in Georgetown, Texas, in 1923, was the first prosecutor to succeed in convicting several Klansmen for a vicious assault and getting them serious prison time.  He became a national sensation overnight, was elected Texas' youngest governor ever in 1926, and was considered for the vice-presidential spot on a national ticket with Franklin Roosevelt.

Bernstein’s third book was widely reviewed by regional and national outlets including NPR’s Morning Edition,
Austin American-Statesman
and Texas Monthly.

In 2023, Patricia Bernstein published her first novel with History Through Fiction, a traditional, small press. The novel, A Noble Cunning: The Countess and the Tower, is based on the true story of Winifred Maxwell, Countess of Nithsdale, a persecuted Catholic noblewoman who, in 1716, rescued her husband from the Tower of London the night before his scheduled execution with the help of a small group of devoted women friends.

Personal life
Ms. Bernstein is married to Alan Bernstein and has three daughters.  Alan Bernstein was a newspaper reporter and editor for 33 years and is now a public relations specialist.

Bibliography

References

Sources

External links
Official site
Bernstein & Associates
Patricia Bernstein papers at the Sophia Smith Collection, Smith College Special Collections

American women novelists
1944 births
Living people
21st-century American women